Thorunna talaverai is a species of dorid nudibranch in the family Chromodorididae.

Distribution 
This species was described from the Galapagos Islands.

References

Chromodorididae
Gastropods described in 1992